Spazio Interiore is an Italian publishing house, founded in Rome in October 2012. Specialized in psicotropia texts, esotericism, philosophy and transpersonal psychology. For the types of Spazio Interiore are published in Italy works of Alejandro Jodorowsky, Claudio Naranjo, Aryeh Kaplan, Rick Strassman, Stanislav Grof, Robert Monroe, E. J. Gold.

External links 
Spazio Interiore Edizioni 

Publishing companies established in 2012
Book publishing companies of Italy
Companies based in Rome
Mass media in Rome